The Bench Crater meteorite is a meteorite discovered on the Moon by Apollo 12 astronauts in 1969. It is part of the friable basalt lunar sample 12037. Found on the north-west rim of the Bench Crater, it is the first meteorite to be discovered on a Solar System body other than the Earth. Its diameter is just a few millimeters. It is listed as a carbonaceous chondrite by the Meteoritical Society.

See also
 Glossary of meteoritics
 Big Bertha (lunar sample)
 Hadley Rille meteorite
 Heat Shield Rock (Mars – Meridiani Planum meteorite)
 List of Martian meteorites
 List of meteorites on Mars

References
 Meteoritical Bulletin Database
 76th Annual Meteoritical Society Meeting (2013)
 Sample 12037

Apollo 12
Meteorites found on the Moon
Pete Conrad
Alan Bean